Markkleeberg-Großstädteln is a railway station in Markkleeberg, Germany. The station is located on the Leipzig–Hof railway. The train services are operated by Deutsche Bahn. Since 15 December 2013 the station is served by the S-Bahn Mitteldeutschland.

The station was opened on 1 November 1907 as Großstädteln. With the integration of Großstädteln into the municipality of Markkleeberg on 1 November 1937, it was renamed Markkleeberg-Großstädteln. From 1879 to the cessation of passenger traffic in 2002, Großstädteln was also a stop on the Leipzig-Plagwitz–Markkleeberg-Gaschwitz railway. It is served by lines S3 and S6.

Train services
The following services currently call at the station:

References

External links

Grossstadteln
Railway stations in Germany opened in 1907